Athletic Park can refer to many places, including:

In the United States
Athletic Grounds, Philadelphia
Athletic Park (Buffalo), also known as Luna Park and Carnival Court
Athletic Park (Denver)
Athletic Park (Duluth)
Athletic Park (Greensburg)
Athletic Park (Indianapolis) 
Athletic Park (Kansas City)
Athletic Park (Los Angeles)
Athletic Park (Milwaukee)
Athletic Park (Minneapolis)
Athletic Park (Nashville), also known as Sulphur Dell
Athletic Park (New Orleans)
Athletic Park (Omaha)
Athletic Park (Philadelphia)
Athletic Park (St. Louis)
Athletic Park (St. Paul)
Athletic Park (Syracuse), also known as Star Park
Athletic Park (Washington)
Athletic Park (Wausau)
Cone Athletic Park, Greensboro, North Carolina
Durham Athletic Park, Durham, North Carolina
Durham Bulls Athletic Park, Durham, North Carolina

In New Zealand
Athletic Park, Wellington

In Canada
Athletic Park (Medicine Hat)
Athletic Park (Vancouver)